Nautilus vitiensis is a species of nautilus native to the waters of Fiji. It was described as a separate species in 2023.

References 

Nautiluses
Molluscs described in 2023
Cephalopods of Oceania